The Big Picture is the fourth studio album from Christian hip-hop artist Da' T.R.U.T.H. It was released on July 21, 2009 through Cross Movement Records.

Track listing 

 "U Ready?" - 3:43
 "The Big Picture Interlude" (Washington, Lambert) - 1:57
 "Legend" - 3:48
 "Tree to Tree" - 3:34
 "Intermission" - 3:54
 "Lost" - 4:45
 "Trumpet Blow" - 4:16
 "You Made" - 4:23
 "Applying the Big Picture" (Washington, Lambert) - 1:18
 "My President" - 4:21
 "Great Wall" - 5:12
 "Fantasy" (Lambert, Pebbles) - 3:46
 "Talk to You" (Abramsamadu, Lambert) - 4:29
 "That Great Day [Remix]" (Lambert, Peebles, Tribbett) - 3:01
 "How Long" (Lambertt, Pittman) - 4:46
 "Pain" - 4:24
 "Suitcase" (Bell, Elliott, Lambert, Swoope) 5:31

Awards 

The album was nominated for a Dove Award for Rap/Hip-Hop Album of the Year at the 41st GMA Dove Awards. The song "Lost" was also nominated for Rap/Hip-Hop Recorded Song of the Year. The Big Picture was also nominated for a Grammy Award for Best Rock or Rap Gospel Album at the 52nd Grammy Awards.

Chart performance 

The album peaked at No. 110 on the Billboard 200, No. 4 on the Billboard Christian Albums chart, and No. 2 on the Gospel Albums chart. It spent 52 weeks on the latter chart.

Notes 

2009 albums
Da' T.R.U.T.H. albums
Albums produced by Swoope
Albums produced by DJ Official